Sadar Hills Autonomous District Council (SHADC) Is an autonomous district council in the state of Manipur India. It covers Saikul Subdivision, Saitu subdivision and Sadar Hills West Subdivision in Kangpokpi District of Manipur. It is one of the six autonomous district councils in Manipur state, and one of twenty five autonomous regions of India..

References

External links

Autonomous district councils of India
Kuki tribes
Year of establishment missing